Century were a French rock band formed in Marseille in 1979. Led by singer and composer Jean-Louis Milford, Century are probably best known for their single "Lover Why" from the album  ...And Soul It Goes from 1986. In Brazil, the track "Lover Why" was included in the Globo TV soap opera Ti Ti Ti's soundtrack (aired from 1985 to 1986) and "Gone with the Winner" was in the soundtrack to Hipertensão (1986–87). As it was the case in that country, that guaranteed both songs would become hits in the Brazilian music charts.

"Lover Why" peaked at #1 in France for seven weeks and also in Portugal, while reaching #11 in Switzerland. Their second single, "Jane" peaked only at #35 in France. Century has sold over ten million copies worldwide.

Members 

The band was composed of Jean-Louis Milford (vocal and keyboards), Éric Traissard (guitar), Laurent Cokelaere (bass), Christian Portes (drums) and a second guitarist, Jean-Dominique Sallaberry. The lyrics of the early successes of the group were all written by Paul Ives. The band split in 1989. However, Jean-Louis Milford teamed up with lyricist Francis Nugent Dixon, and since 1989, they have worked together. After several unsuccessful albums, they produced a double CD in 2006 (Timeless).

After nearly two years of development, working with Walter Clissen in Los Angeles, they entered into the American market with a musical comedy "Seven Stars in Paradise" (2012–2013).

Jean-Louis "John" Milford: vocals, keyboards
Jean-Dominique Sallaberry: guitar
Eric Traissard: guitar
Laurent Cokelaere: bass
Christian Portes: drums

Discography

Albums
1986: ...And Soul It Goes
 "Pay As You Hurt"
 "Lover Why"
 "Nigel Understand"
 "(On A) Landslide"
 "Jane"
 "The Day the Water Dried"
 "Gone with the Winner"
 "Self Destruction"
 "Fly Me to the Ground"

1988: Is It Red?
"Colour of the Wine" (Fast Version)
"Gemini" (First Version)
"Does She Love You to Mother You?"
"A Donf-Himalaya"
"Blues on a Monday"
"High on the Beam"
"Colour of the Wine" (Slow Version)
"This Way to Heaven"
"O'Radio"
"Mixed Amelia"
"Out of My Way"
"Is It Red?"

Singles
 1985: "Lover Why"/"Rainin' in the Park"
 1986: "Jane"/"Help Me Help"
 1986: "Gone with the Winner"/"The Day the Water Dried"
 1986: "Self-Destruction"/"Fly Me to the Ground"
 1988: "This Way to Heaven"/"High on the Beam"

References

External links
 TITITI National and International-soundtracks
 Hipertensão : National and International-soundtracks

French progressive rock groups
Musical groups established in 1979
Musical groups disestablished in 1989
Musical groups from Marseille
1979 establishments in France